Rasky is a surname. Notable people with the surname include:

Harry Rasky (1928–2007), Canadian documentary film producer
Susan Rasky (1952–2013), American university educator and political journalist

See also
Kasky
Rask (disambiguation)